Racial democracy is a term used by some to describe race relations in Brazil.  The term denotes some scholars' belief that Brazil has escaped racism and racial discrimination. Those researchers contend that Brazilians do not view each other through the lens of race and do not harbor racial prejudice towards one another. Because of that, while social mobility of Brazilians may be constrained by many factors, gender and class included, racial discrimination is considered irrelevant (within the confines of the concept racial democracy).

Overview
Racial democracy was first advanced by Brazilian sociologist Gilberto Freyre in his work Casa-Grande & Senzala (English: The Masters and the Slaves), published in 1933. Although Freyre never uses this term in the book, he did adopt it in later publications, and his theories paved the way for other scholars who would popularize the concept.

Freyre argued that several factors, including close relations between masters and slaves prior to their legal emancipation in 1888 and the supposedly benign character of Portuguese imperialism prevented the emergence of strict racial categories. Freyre also argued that continued miscegenation between the three races (Amerindians, the descendants of African slaves, and whites) would lead to a "meta-race", i.e.', a "postracial race" or a "race beyond race(s)".

Freyre's theory became a source of national pride for Brazil, which contrasted itself favorably vis-a-vis the contemporaneous racial divisions and violence in the United States.  Over time, his theory would become widely accepted both among Brazilians of all stripes and many foreign academics. Black researchers in the United States would make unfavorable comparisons between their own country and Brazil during the 1960s.

In the past four decades, after the publication in 1974 of Thomas E. Skidmore's Black into White, a revisionist study of Brazilian race relations, scholars have begun to criticize the notion that Brazil is actually a "racial democracy".  Skidmore argues that the predominantly white elite within Brazilian society promoted racial democracy to obscure very real forms of racial oppression.

Michael Hanchard, a political scientist at the University of Pennsylvania, has argued that the ideology of racial democracy, often promoted by state apparatuses, prevents effective action to combat racial discrimination by leading people to ascribe discrimination to other forms of oppression and allowing government officials charged with preventing racism to deny its existence a priori.

France Winddance Twine's 1997 ethnography also appears to support those contentions.

Hanchard compiles a great deal of research from other scholars demonstrating widespread discrimination in employment, education, and electoral politics. The seemingly paradoxical use of racial democracy to obscure the realities of racism has been referred to by scholar Florestan Fernandes as the "prejudice of having no prejudices". That is, because the state assumes the absence of racial prejudice, it fails to enforce what few laws exist to counter racial discrimination, as it believes that such efforts are unnecessary. In 2015, North American anthropologist John Collins argued that shifting engagements with collective memory, genealogically-based accounts of ancestry, and even UNESCO World Heritage programs have articulated with efforts by the Black Movement, academics, and progressive government actors to undermine claims about racial democracy in ways that increasingly lead Brazilians to self-identify as Black.

Gilberto Freyre on criticism 

The life of Gilberto Freyre, after he published Casa-Grande & Senzala, became an eternal source of explanation. He repeated several times that he did not create the myth of a racial democracy, and that the fact that his books recognized the intense mixing between "races" in Brazil did not signify a lack of prejudice or discrimination. He pointed out that many people have claimed the United States to have been an "exemplary democracy" whereas slavery and racial segregation were present throughout most of the history of the United States.

"The interpretation of those who want to place me among the sociologists or anthropologists who said prejudice of race among the Portuguese or the Brazilians never existed is extreme. What I have always suggested is that such prejudice is minimal ... when compared to that which is still in place elsewhere, where laws still regulate relations between Europeans and other groups".

"It is not that racial prejudice or social prejudice related to complexion are absent in Brazil. They exist. But no one here would have thought of "white-only" Churches. No one in Brazil would have thought of laws against interracial marriage ... Fraternal spirit is stronger among Brazilians than racial prejudice, color, class or religion. It is true that equality has not been reached since the end of slavery ... There was racial prejudice among plantation owners, there was social distance between the masters and the slaves, between whites and blacks ... But few wealthy Brazilians were as concerned with racial purity as the majority were in the Old South".

See also

Assimilado
Casta
Colonial mentality
Colorism
La Raza Cósmica
Lusotropicalism
Mongrel complex
Multiracial democracy
Pardo
Partus sequitur ventrem
Race in Brazil
Racial hierarchy
Racial hygiene
Racial whitening in Brazil (Blanqueamiento)
Racism in Brazil
Racism in a Racial Democracy
Rainbow nation
Religious harmony in India
White privilege
Whitewashing (beauty)

References

Multiracial affairs in Brazil
Race in Latin America
Brazilian cultural conventions
Race and society